Joseph Moore (born 15 November 1880, date of death unknown) was a Barbadian cricketer. He played in five first-class matches for the Barbados cricket team from 1904 to 1910.

See also
 List of Barbadian representative cricketers

References

External links
 

1880 births
Year of death missing
Barbadian cricketers
Barbados cricketers
People from Saint George, Barbados